Arifa Khalid Pervaiz is a Pakistani politician who had been a member of the National Assembly of Pakistan, from June 2013 to May 2018.

Education
She has completed her Masters in Child Development from Government College of Home Economics and completed her Masters in International Policy and Practice from the Elliott School of International Affairs, George Washington University.

Political career
She was elected to the Provincial Assembly of the Punjab as a candidate of Pakistan Muslim League (N) in 2008 Pakistani general election.

She was elected to the National Assembly of Pakistan as a candidate of Pakistan Muslim League (N) on a reserved seat for women in the 2013 Pakistani general election.

References

Pakistani MNAs 2013–2018
Living people
Pakistan Muslim League (N) politicians
Punjabi women
Women members of the National Assembly of Pakistan
Year of birth missing (living people)
Elliott School of International Affairs alumni
21st-century Pakistani women politicians